The Brat is a 1919 American silent drama film produced by and starring Alla Nazimova and directed by Herbert Blache. The film was released by Metro Pictures, who had Nazimova under contract, and is based on Maude Fulton's 1917 Broadway play in which she starred. It was remade as the 1931 film The Brat with Sally O'Neil in the lead role. The film is lost.

Plot
As described in a film magazine, the Brat (Nazimova), a chorus girl known by no other name, is discharged from the Summer Garden chorus when she refuses to submit to the advances of Stephen Forrester (Foss), a young waster. He follows her down the street and quarrel ensues, after which she is arrested. At court she is found by MacMillan Forrester (Bryant), her prosecutor's elder brother, who is a novelist in search of an underworld character to study. The judge allows her to go to his home to live for that purpose. Here her unvarnished manner cause Forrester's fiancee and her father, as well as Mrs. Forrester (Veness), much uneasiness. The Brat keeps Stephen's record a secret out of respect for his brother. When the novel is finished and the Brat is about to leave, Stephen attempts to rob MacMillan's safe and the Brat takes the blame. Stephen then makes a clean breast of the affair which exonerates the Brat, and MacMillan's fiancee releases him to marry the woman he has learned to love.

Cast
Alla Nazimova as The Brat
Charles Bryant as MacMillan Forrester
Amy Veness as Mrs. Forrester
Frank Currier as The Bishop
Darrell Foss as Stephen Forrester
Bonnie Hill as Angela
Milla Davenport as The Brat's Aunt
Henry Kolker as A Dandy
Ethelbert Knott as Butler

References

External links

1919 films
American silent feature films
American films based on plays
Lost American films
Films directed by Herbert Blaché
1919 drama films
Silent American drama films
American black-and-white films
1919 lost films
Lost drama films
1910s American films
1910s English-language films